The West Indies women's cricket team, nicknamed the Windies, is a combined team of players from various countries in the Caribbean that competes in international women's cricket. The team is organised by the West Indies Cricket Board (WICB), a full member of the International Cricket Council (ICC), which represents fifteen countries and territories.

At the inaugural edition of the World Cup, in 1973, two teams that now compete as part of the West Indies, Jamaica and Trinidad and Tobago, competed separately. A combined West Indian team made its Test debut in 1976 (almost 50 years after its male counterpart), and its One Day International (ODI) in 1979.

The West Indies currently competes in the ICC Women's Championship, the highest level of the sport, and has participated in five of the ten editions of the Women's Cricket World Cup held to date. At the most recent 2013 World Cup, the team made the tournament's final for the first time, but lost to Australia.

At the ICC World Twenty20, the team won its first title at the 2016 tournament, having made the semi-finals in each of the preceding tournaments.

History

Test history

The first Test series played by the West Indies was at home to Australia in 1975–76, when both the three-day matches were drawn. In 1976–77 the same team then played a six Test series away to India. They lost the fourth and then won the sixth Test by over an innings to level the series. The remaining games were drawn.

1979 then saw the Windies play their third Test series, this time away to England. However, they fared poorly, losing the first and third Tests and drawing the second to go down 2–0.

Finally, in 2003–04, after a 24-year wait, the West Indies resumed Test cricket with a one-off match away to Pakistan, this time played over 4 days. The result was a draw.

One-Day International history

When the first World Cup was played in 1973, the West Indies did not compete as an individual unit. Instead a separate team represented Jamaica, and another side represented Trinidad and Tobago. Additionally, three West Indian players participated in an International XI side that also competed in the 1973 World Cup. None of the teams fared well, however, with the International XI finishing in fourth place out of seven with a record of won three, lost two and one no result; Trinidad and Tobago finishing fifth with two wins and four losses; and Jamaica finishing sixth with one win, four losses and one match abandoned.

The first one-day internationals (ODIs) played by a combined West Indian side were two games away to England during their 1979 tour. Three ODIs were planned, but the second ODI was washed out without a ball being bowled. In the first ODI, England won comfortably by eight wickets, and in the third ODI saw the West Indies level the series with a two wicket win.

1993 saw West Indian players compete in a World Cup for the second time, this time as part of a combined team. They finished seventh, with only Denmark and the Netherlands below them, after winning only two and losing five of their seven matches. Their next games were in the 1997–98 World Cup, where they finished in ninth place, above only Denmark and Pakistan. The only match they won was the 9th place play-off game against the Danes.

2002–03 saw the Sri Lankan women's cricket team tour the West Indies and play a six-match ODI series, which the Sri Lankan's won six-nil. The closest match was the fourth, where the Windies went down by only 9 runs. 2003 saw the Windies greatest cricketing success, when they finished second in the International Women's Cricket Council Trophy, after winning four and losing one of their five games. The Trophy was competed for by the weaker ODI sides – Ireland, Windies, the Netherlands, Pakistan, Scotland and Japan.

2003–04 saw the Windies play five ODIs in India followed by a seven ODI and one Test tour to Pakistan. All five games against India were lost comfortably. As expected, the tour to Pakistan was more successful and the ODI series was won five-two.

They finished fifth in the 2004–05 World Cup, ahead of Sri Lanka, South Africa and Ireland, but behind Australia, India, New Zealand and India. They won two and lost three games, with one no result and one abandoned match. After being eliminated from the World Cup, the team stayed on to play three ODIs against South Africa and won the series two-nil.

Tournament history

Women's Cricket World Cup 

1973 to 1988: Did not participate
1993: 6th place
1997: 9th place
2000: Did not participate
2005: 5th place
2009: 5th place
2013: 2nd place
2017: 6th place
2022: 4th place (Semifinals)

ICC Women's World Twenty20 

2009: 5th place
2010: Semi-Finalists
2012: Semi-Finalists
2014: Semi-Finalists
2016: Champions
2018: Semi-Finalists

ICC Women's Cricket Challenge 

2010: 1st place

Honours
Women's World Cup:
 Runners-up (1): 2013
Women's T20 World Cup:
 Champions (1): 2016

Squad
This lists all the players who have either played for West Indies in the past 3 months or is Centrally contracted by Cricket West Indies.

Centrally contracted players are listed in bold. Uncapped players are listed in italics.

Coaching staff

 Team Manager: Evril Betty Lewis
 Head coach: Courtney Walsh
 Assistant coach: Courtney Walsh
 Assistant coach: Rayon Griffith
 Physiotherapist: Marita Marshall
 Strength and conditioning Coach: Shayne Cooper
 Team Psychologist: Olivia Rose Esperance
 Team Analyst: Gary Belle
 Team Media Officer: Nassira Mohammed

Records

Test cricket

Highest team total: 440 v Pakistan, 15 March 2004 at National Stadium, Karachi, Pakistan
Highest individual innings: 118, Nadine George v Pakistan, 15 March 2004 at National Stadium, Karachi, Pakistan
Best innings bowling: 5/48, Vivalyn Latty-Scott v Australia, 7 May 1976 at Montego Bay, Jamaica
Best match bowling: 5/26, Peggy Fairweather v India, 27 November 1976 at Jammu, India

ODI cricket

Highest team total: 368/8 v Sri Lanka, 3 February 2013 at Mumbai, India
Highest individual innings: 171, Stafanie Taylor v Sri Lanka, 3 February 2013 at Mumbai, India 
Best innings bowling: 5/36, Cherry-Ann Singh v Ireland, 29 July 1993 at Dorking, England

T20I cricket

Highest team total: 191/4 v Netherlands, 16 October 2010 at Potchefstroom, South Africa

See also

Women's cricket
List of West Indies women Test cricketers
List of West Indies women ODI cricketers
List of West Indies women Twenty20 International cricketers
West Indian men's cricket team

References

External links
Cricket Archive details of West Indies in women's Tests
Cricket Archive detaiils of West Indies in women's ODIs

 
Women's national cricket teams